Al-Naimah, also al-Naima, al-Naimeh or Elnaymah, is a village in southern Syria, administratively part of the Daraa Governorate, located east of Daraa. Nearby localities include Ataman to the northwest and Saida to the east.

History
In  the Ottoman  tax registers of 1596, it was a village located the nahiya of  Butayna,  Qada of Hauran, under the name of Nu'ayma. It had a population of 35 households and 12  bachelors, all Muslims. They paid a fixed tax-rate of 40% on agricultural products, including wheat, barley, summer crops, goats and beehives, in addition to occasional revenues; a total of 15,600 akçe.

In the 1850s, the village  was reestablished by the townspeople of Daraa during a resurgence in grain cultivation to meet growing demand in the Damascene and European markets.

According to the Syria Central Bureau of Statistics, al-Naimah had a population of 7,472 in the 2004 census.

References

Bibliography

External links
Map of town, Google Maps
Deraa-map, 22L

Populated places in Daraa District